In enzymology, an UDP-galactose—UDP-N-acetylglucosamine galactose phosphotransferase is an enzyme that catalyzes the chemical reaction

UDP-galactose + UDP-N-acetyl-D-glucosamine  UMP + UDP-N-acetyl-6-(D-galactose-1-phospho)-D-glucosamine

Thus, the two substrates of this enzyme are UDP-galactose and UDP-N-acetyl-D-glucosamine, whereas its two products are UMP and UDP-N-acetyl-6-(D-galactose-1-phospho)-D-glucosamine.

This enzyme belongs to the family of transferases, specifically those transferring phosphorus-containing groups transferases for other substituted phosphate groups.  The systematic name of this enzyme class is UDP-galactose:UDP-N-acetyl-D-glucosamine galactose phosphotransferase. Other names in common use include uridine diphosphogalactose-uridine diphosphoacetylglucosamine galactose-1-phosphotransferase, galactose-1-phosphotransferase, and galactosyl phosphotransferase.

References

 

EC 2.7.8
Enzymes of unknown structure